Nya Åland is a Swedish language newspaper in Åland, an autonomous region in Finland. It is the second largest local newspaper on Åland, following Ålandstidningen.

History and profile
Nya Åland was founded in 1981 as a cooperative movement. Hasse Svensson was the editor-in-chief of Ålandstidningen and left it following an internal dispute to form Nya Åland.  The paper is published in tabloid format.

At the initial phase, Nya Åland was published twice per week. Then it began to be published five times a week (Monday through Friday).

References

External links
Nya Åland

1981 establishments in Finland
Mass media in Åland
Daily newspapers published in Finland
Newspapers established in 1981
Swedish-language newspapers published in Finland